James Gadson ( James Edward Gadson; born June 17, 1939) is an American drummer and session musician. Beginning his career in the late 1960s, Gadson has since become one of the most-recorded drummers in the history of R&B. He is also a singer and songwriter.

Career 
Born in Kansas City, Missouri, Gadson played with the first line-up of Charles Wright's Watts 103rd Street Rhythm Band, and recorded three albums with them between 1968 and 1970. Along with other members of Wright's band, he went on to appear on many hit records, including with Dyke & the Blazers. Gadson started to become well known as a drummer following the release of the album Still Bill by Bill Withers, released by Sussex Records in 1972. He played on The Temptations album 1990, released on the Motown label in 1973. 

In 1975, he played with Freddie King on Larger Than Life and went on to record with Martha Reeves, Randy Crawford, Quincy Jones, Herbie Hancock, B.B. King, Albert King, Rose Royce, Elkie Brooks and many more artists. In 1975, he anchored the Motown classic double platinum album City Of Angels, recorded by Billy Griffin & The Miracles.

Gadson was also the drummer on Marvin Gaye's "I Want You" in 1976 and Diana Ross's hit 1976 single Love Hangover and appeared on two tracks, "At The Mercy" and "Riding To Vanity Fair", on the 2005 Paul McCartney album Chaos and Creation in the Backyard.

He has a brief appearance in the Adam Sandler 2009 movie Funny People as a member of the jam band that Sandler's character hires to play with him.

In April 2009, Gadson joined Alex Dixon, grandson of Willie Dixon, on his 2009 release titled Rising From The Bushes, in which he appeared on two tracks, "Fantasy" and Willie Dixon's famous song "Spoonful".

In June 2009, Gadson joined Beck, Wilco, Feist and Jamie Lidell covering Skip Spence's Oar as part of Beck's Record Club series, with videos appearing on Beck's website beginning November 2009. He has drummed on Beck's albums Sea Change, The Information and Morning Phase, as well as Jamie Lidell's 2010 album Compass. Gadson played drums, as well as hambone (slapping his legs), on the D'Angelo song "Sugah Daddy", on the Black Messiah album (2014). He appeared in the 2016 video for “Mama Can’t Help You No More,” by Doyle Bramhall II.

In 2019, James Gadson, who resides in Los Angeles, was featured on Gordon Ramsay's 24 Hours to Hell and Back as his paternal niece's and nephew-in-law's restaurant, Bayou on the Vine, was renamed "Gadson's Restaurant & Jazz Club", named after him and his late brother, guitarist Thomas Maurice 'Tutty' Gadson (died 2014).

Discography

Singles
 "Express Yourself" (Charles Wright & the Watts 103rd Street Band) - (1970)
 "Lean On Me" (Bill Withers) - (1972)
 "Use Me" (Bill Withers) - (1972)
 "Got To Find My Baby" / "Let The Feeling Belong" - Cream Records 1014 - (1972)
 "Good Vibrations" / "Just To Love You Girl" - Cream Records 1019 - (1972)
 "Dancing Machine" (Jackson 5) - (1974)
 "I Want You" (Marvin Gaye) - (1976)
 "Love Hangover" (Diana Ross) - (1976)
 "Go By What's In Your Heart" / "Go By What's In Your Heart" - United Artists UA-XW815-Y  - (1976) 
 "Got To Be Real" (Cheryl Lynn) - (1978)
James Gadson & Lou Washington
 Gadson & Washington - "Ain't No Way To Live" / "Indian Village" - B And W Records – BW-011, B And W Records – BW-012 (12" 33rpm single)

As sideman
With Mindi Abair
 In Hi-Fi Stereo (Heads Up, 2010)
 Wild Heart (Heads Up, 2014)
With Arthur Adams
 Back on Track (Blind Pig, 1999)
 Soul of the Blues (PM Records, 2004)
 Stomp the Floor (Delta Groove, 2009)
 Here to Make You Feel Good (Cleopatra, 2019)
With Alessi Brothers
 Driftin (A&M Records, 1979)With Herb Alpert Herb Alpert / Hugh Masekela (Horizon, 1978)With Corinne Bailey Rae The Heart Speaks in Whispers (Virgin Records, 2016)With Philip Bailey Continuation (Columbia Records, 1983)With Anita Baker The Songstress (Elektra Records, 1983)With Jimmy Barnes Soul Deeper... Songs From the Deep South (Mushroom Records, 2000)
 The Rhythm and the Blues (Liberation Records, 2009)With Beck Sea Change (Geffen, 2002)
 The Information (Idenscope Records, 2006)
 Morning Phase (Capitol Records, 2014)With Booker T. & the M.G.'s That's The Way It Should Be (Columbia, 1994)With Doyle Bramhall II Rich Man (Concord Records, 2016)With Dianne Brooks Back Stairs in My Life (Reprise Records, 1976)With Elkie Brooks Live and Learn (A&M Records, 1979)With Peabo Bryson and Natalie Cole We're the Best of Friends (Capitol Records, 1979)With Solomon Burke Make Do with What You Got (Shout! Factory, 2005)With Jerry Butler Power Of Love (Mercury Records, 1973)With Terry Callier Fire on Ice (Elektra, 1979)With David Castle Castle in the Sky (Casablanca, 1977)
 Love You Forever (Casablanca, 1979)With Kelly Clarkson Wrapped in Red (RCA Records, 2013)With Jimmy Cliff Follow My Mind (Reprise, 1975)With Joe Cocker Hymn for My Soul (EMI, 2007)With Adam Cohen Adam Cohen (Columbia Records, 1998)With Leonard Cohen The Future (Columbia Records, 1992)With Natalie Cole Thankful (Capitol Records, 1977)
 Don't Look Back (Capitol Records, 1980)With Nikka Costa Pebble to a Pearl (Stax Records, 2008)With Randy Crawford Everything Must Change (Warner Bros. Records, 1976)
 Raw Silk (Warner Bros. Records, 1979)
 Nightline (Warner Bros. Records, 1983)With Jamie Cullum Catching Tales (Verve, 2005)With D'Angelo Black Messiah (RCA Records, 2014)With Lana Del Rey Paradise (Polydor Records, 2012)With Jackie DeShannon You're the Only Dancer (Amherst Records, 1977)With Marcella Detroit The Vehicle (Right, 2013)With The 5th Dimension High on Sunshine (Motown, 1978)With Donovan Lady of the Stars (RCA Records, 1984)With Yvonne Elliman Love Me (RSO Records, 1977)
 Night Flight (RSO Records, 1978)With Donald Fagen The Nightfly (Warner Bros. Records, 1982)With Yvonne Fair The Bitch Is Black (Motown, 1975)With José Feliciano José Feliciano (Motown, 1981)With Aretha Franklin Sweet Passion (Atlantic Records, 1977)
 Aretha (Arista Records, 1986)With Toko Furuuchi Hourglass (Sony Records, 1996)With Charlotte Gainsbourg IRM (Beck, 2009)With Marvin Gaye I Want You (Motown, 1976)
 Midnight Love (Columbia Records, 1982)With Gloria Gaynor Love Tracks (Polydor Records, 1978)
 I Have a Right (Polydor Records, 1979)
 Stories (Polydor Records, 1980)With Terry Garthwaite Terry (Arista, 1975)With Terry Garthwaite and Toni Brown The Joy (Fantasy, 1977)With Benny Golson Killer Joe (Columbia, 1977)With Herbie Hancock Man-Child (Columbia, 1975)With John Handy Hard Work (ABC, 1976) 
 Carnival (ABC, 1977)With Thelma Houston and Jerry Butler Thelma & Jerry (Motown, 1977)With Thelma Houston Ready to Roll (Motown, 1978)
 Breakwater Cat (RCA Records, 1980)With La Toya Jackson La Toya Jackson (Polydor, 1980)With Norah Jones The Fall (Blue Note, 2009)With Rickie Lee Jones The Evening of My Best Day (V2 Records, 2003)With Al Johnson Back for More (Columbia, 1980)With Margie Joseph Hear the Words, Feel the Feeling (Cotillion, 1976)
 Feeling My Way (Atlantic, 1978)With Keane Brothers Taking Off (ABC Records, 1979)With Eddie Kendricks Boogie Down! (Tamla, 1974)
 The Hit Man (Tamla, 1975)With Albert King'''
 Truckload of Lovin (Tomato Records, 1976)With Ben E. King Let Me Live in Your Life (Atlantic Records, 1978)With B.B. King Midnight Believer (ABC Records, 1978)
 Take It Home (MCA Records, 1979)With Elle King 
 Love Stuff (RCA Records, 2015)With Freddie King Larger Than Life (RSO Records, 1976)With Charles Kynard Charles Kynard (Mainstream, 1971)With Patti LaBelle Patti LaBelle (Epic Records, 1977)
 Tasty (Epic Records, 1978)
 Winner in You (MCA Records, 1986)With Amos Lee Amos Lee (Blue Note Records, 2005)
 Last Days at the Lodge (Blue Note Records, 2008)
 Mission Bell (Blue Note Records, 2011)With Jamie Lidell Compass (Warp Records, 2010)With Jon Lucien Romantico (Zamajo, 1980)With Cheryl Lynn Cheryl Lynn (Columbia Records, 1978)
 In Love (Columbia Records, 1979)
 In the Night (Columbia Records, 1981)With Florence and the Machine High as Hope (Virgin, 2018)With Melissa Manchester Don't Cry Out Loud (Arista Records, 1978)With Teena Marie Starchild (Epic Records, 1984)With Ziggy Marley Fly Rasta (Tuff Gong Worldwide, 2014)With Paul McCartney Chaos and Creation in the Backyard (Parlophone, 2005) With Gwen McCrae On My Way (Atlantic, 1982)With Lonette McKee Lonette (Sussex, 1974)
 Words and Music (Warner Bros., 1978)With Shannon McNally Jukebox Sparrows (Capitol Records, 2002)With Bette Midler Bette (Warner Bros. Records, 2000)With Blue Mitchell Stratosonic Nuances (RCA, 1975)
 African Violet (Impulse!, 1977)
 Summer Soft (Impulse!, 1978)With Barbara Morrison Love'n You (P.C.H., 1990)With Aaron Neville Bring It On Home... The Soul Classics (Sony Music, 2006)With Paolo Nutini Caustic Love (Atlantic, 2014)With Freda Payne Hot (Capitol, 1979)With Sweet Pea Atkinson Get What You Deserve (Blue Note, 2017)With Teddy Pendergrass Workin' It Back (Asylum Records, 1985)With Billy Preston Late at Night (Motown, 1979)
 The Way I Am (Motown, 1981)
 Pressin' On (Motown, 1982)With Margo Price That's How Rumors Get Started (Loma Vista, 2020)With Helen Reddy Reddy (Capitol Records, 1979)With Martha Reeves Martha Reeves (MCA Records, 1974)
 We Meet Again (Fantasy Records, 1978)With Simply Red Home (Simplyred.com, 2003)With Terry Reid Seed of Memory (ABC, 1976)With LeAnn Rimes Today Is Christmas (Kobalt Label Service, 2015)With Minnie Riperton Stay in Love (Epic Records, 1977)With Smokey Robinson Love Breeze (Tamla, 1978)
 Where There's Smoke... (Tamla, 1979)
 Warm Thoughts (Motown, 1980)
 Being with You (Motown, 1981)
 Touch the Sky (Motown, 1983)
 Love, Smokey (Motown, 1990)With Rockie Robbins Rockie Robbins (A&M, 1979)
 You and Me (A&M, 1980)With Nate Ruess Grand Romantic (Fueled, 2015)With Patrice Rushen Shout It Out (Prestige, 1977)
 Patrice (Elektra, 1978)
 Pizzazz (Elektra, 1979)
 Posh (Elektra, 1980)
 Straight from the Heart (Elektra, 1982)With Lara Saint Paul Saffo Music (Lasapa, 1977)With Evie Sands Suspended Animation (RCA Victor, 1979)With Boz Scaggs Slow Dancer (Columbia Records, 1974)With Lalo Schifrin Rollercoaster (MCA, 1977)With Nancy Shanks Nancy Shanx (United Artists, 1977)With Marlena Shaw Sweet Beginnings (Columbia Records, 1977)With Michelle Shocked Mexican Standoff (Mighty Sound, 2005)With Lynwood Slim Last Call (Delta Groove, 2006)With Phoebe Snow It Looks Like Snow (Columbia Records, 1976)With Barbra Streisand Wet (Columbia Records, 1979)With Harry Styles Fine Line (Columbia Records, 2019)With Tavares Check It Out (Capital, 1974) 
 Sky High! (Capital, 1976)With Justin Timberlake FutureSex/LoveSounds (Jive Records, 2006)With Keith Urban Ripcord (Capitol, 2016)With Frankie Valli Heaven Above Me (MCA Records, 1980)With Thijs Van Leer O My Love (Phillips Records, 1975)With Kenny Vance Short Vacation (Gold Castle, 1988)With Vulfpeck Mr Finish Line (Vulf, 2017)
 Running Away (Vulf, 2017)With Leon Ware Musical Massage (Gordy, 1976)
 Leon Ware (Elektra, 1982)With Was (Not Was) Boo! (Rykodisc, 2008)With Bill Withers Still Bill (Sussex, 1972)
 +'Justments (Sussex, 1974)With Charles Wright & the Watts 103rd Street Rhythm Band Express Yourself (Warner Bros., 1970)
 You're So Beautiful (Warner Bros., 1971)With Syreeta Wright Rich Love, Poor Love (Motown, 1977)
 One to One (Motown, 1977)
 Set My Love in Motion (Motown, 1981)With Michael Wycoff' Love Conquers All (RCA Records, 1982)
 On the Line (RCA Records, 1983)

References

Bibliography
 Vincent, Rickey (1996). Funk: The Music, The People, and The Rhythm of The One''. St. Martin's Press. .

External links
2013 Audio Interview with James Gadson from the Podcast "I'd Hit That"
Modern Drummer Article on James Gadson
 Brian LeBarton interviews James Gadson
  Review of Rising from the Bushes including James Gadson
The Sessions Panel Dom Famularo interviews James Gadson Part 1, The Sessions Panel Dom Famularo interviews James Gadson Part 2
James Gadson Interview - NAMM Oral History Library (2015)

1939 births
Living people
Musicians from Kansas City, Missouri
American rhythm and blues musicians
American session musicians
American funk drummers
American male drummers
Rhythm and blues drummers
20th-century American drummers
20th-century American male musicians